The Album is the debut LP from German electronical composer and producer Roger-Pierre Shah.

Track listing

External links 
 

2000 albums